Bulkships was an Australian shipping company.

History
Bulkships was founded in 1958 by the Adelaide Steamship Company, Howard Smith and McIlwraith, McEacharn & Co as a bulk carrier operator. By 1968, Adelaide Steamship Company and McIlwraith, McEacharn & Co each owned 50%. 

In August 1970, TNT purchased a one-third shareholding. By 1972, it owned a 25% shareholding in RW Miller. In February 1977, TNT bought out Adelaide Steamship Company taking its shareholding to 63% with McIlwraith, McEacharn & Co owning 37% with the business rebranded TNT Bulkships.

References

Defunct shipping companies of Australia
Transport companies established in 1958
1958 establishments in Australia